Mary Evelyn Wrinch (1877–1969), was a Canadian artist who created miniature paintings, oil paintings, and block prints, sometimes inspired by the Northern Ontario landscape. She pioneered the 'Canadian style', painting landscapes with bold colours of the Algoma, Muskoka and Lake Superior regions, in situ. In her miniature paintings on ivory, she depicted her sitters with freshness and vitality. Her colour block prints are virtuoso examples of the medium.

Early life 
Wrinch was born in 1877 in Kirby-le-Soken, Essex in the United Kingdom to her parents, Leonard and Elizabeth Cooper Wrinch. Upon her father's passing, she immigrated at the age of 8 with her mother to Bronte, Ontario, and after a trip back to England, in 1889, relocated to Toronto, Ontario. In Toronto, she attended the Bishop Strachan School, a private school in the Forest Hill area, in 1889. In the 1890s, Wrinch studied with George Agnew Reid (whom she later married in 1922) along with artists Laura Muntz and Robert Holmes at the Central Ontario School of Art. Wrinch attended the School from 1889–1893, (now known as OCAD University) where she studied both printmaking and painting. She went through numerous degrees, and began graduate studies at Grosvenor School of Modern Art in London until 1899 under the direction of Walter Donne. Wrinch later returned to Toronto where she studied at the Ontario College of Art & Design with Laura Muntz, Robert Holmes and George Agnew Reid. She later took part in two private studies, one in London, England under Alyn Williams, and another in New York under Alice Beckington, before joining the Art Students’ League in New York.

Career 
Wrinch was first a painter of miniatures on ivory in Toronto and then, around 1906, turned to the landscape of Muskoka and painted a sketch of a sawmill there during a visit to Kathleen Lizars, an author and friend. Back in Toronto, she painted a larger canvas, Saw Mill, Muskoka (Art Gallery of Ontario). She continued painting landscape, but turned to the colour linoleum print, around 1928. She served as the Art Director at Bishop Strachan School (BSS) from 1901 to 1936. While holding this position, she designed the school's chapel interior, including a large stained-glass window.

Throughout her career in education and art, Wrinch was a member of many artist organizations. She was made an Associate member of the Royal Canadian Academy of Arts, and actively worked with the Ontario Society of Artists, a professional artists association advocating for visual arts in Ontario through exhibitions and special projects. Wrinch also was a member of the Heliconian Club and the Women's Art Association of Canada, which are two non-profit associations that connect and promote women's participation in the arts. Besides these groups, Wrinch was a member of the Canadian Society of Painters in Watercolour, American Society of Miniature Painters, Canadian Handicrafts Guild and Canadian Society of Graphic Art.

Wrinch's first commercial exhibition was at The Art Metropole (241 Yonge Street) in 1966. It was curated by former curator and dealer Jerrold Morris and included 50 of Wrinch's works alongside 50 of Mary Heister Reid’s works. Wrinch’s first public exhibition was in 1969 at the Art Gallery of Ontario and was curated by Joan Murray.

Little scholarship on Mary Wrinch's art exists to date. Muriel Miller originally wrote on the artist's life and career in 1940. Curator Joan Murray wrote, "Mary Wrinch: Canadian Artist," in the journal, Canadian Antiques Collector, in 1969. This essay remains as the most significant and comprehensive writing on Wrinch's art along with Chris Dickman`s essay in The Prints of Mary Wrinch.

In 1925 and the years that followed, Wrinch frequently sketched with her husband, George Reid, in Algoma, Temagami, Bruce Peninsula and Ottawa Valley. She ended her artistic career in 1944.

In 2020, the Art Gallery of Ontario exhibited her miniature portraits and landscape prints in a show titled Mary Wrinch: Painted from Life".

 Artwork 

Wrinch worked in many artistic mediums including oil paint, watercolour, drawing and printmaking. She is best known for her linoleum block style prints. Wrinch's earliest use of black and white linoleum block prints was in 1928. By 1930, she introduced colour to her prints by using linocut. Landscapes of Northern Ontario and florals are her most common print subjects. Her two most well-known works are Breaking Clouds (1931–1932) and Scarboro (1935–1938). Both works are colour linocut on wove paper and are found in the Canadian Prints and Drawings section of the National Gallery of Canada.

Her paintings are in the collections of the Art Gallery of Ontario, Museum London in Ontario, the Montreal Museum of Fine Arts, the National Gallery of Canada and the Robert McLaughlin Gallery, among others.

 Personal life 
In 1922, Wrinch married George Agnew Reid, a Toronto-based mural painter and architect who was her teacher at the Central Ontario School of Art and afterwards her friend, as was Mary Hiester Reid (1854-1921), his wife. Reid married Wrinch soon after the Mary Hiester Reid died. Wrinch and Reid lived together in the Wychwood Park area, known as an arts and crafts community because it was founded by created in 1888 as a private residential enclave for artists and businessmen by landscape artist Marmaduke Matthews. After 25 years of marriage to Wrinch, George Agnew Reid died in 1947. Wrinch died in Toronto in 1969 at age 90.

Record sale prices
At the Cowley Abbott Auction, Important Canadian Art (Sale 1), December 1, 2022, Lot #35, French Canadian Cottage'' (1926), oil on board, 10 x 12 ins (25.4 x 30.5 cms), Auction Estimate: $4,000.00 - $6,000.00, realized a price of $14,400.00.

See also 
 Group of Seven (artists)
 George Reid

References

Further reading

External links 
 images of Mary E. Wrinch's paintings at the National Gallery of Canada

Artists from Toronto
Canadian people of English descent
Canadian women painters
20th-century Canadian women artists
20th-century Canadian artists
1877 births
1969 deaths
English emigrants to Canada
Canadian landscape painters
Canadian printmakers